Philodendron hederaceum,  the heartleaf philodendron (syn. Philodendron scandens) is a species of flowering plant in the family Araceae, native to Central America and the Caribbean which is common in the houseplant trade. Philodendron hederaceum var. hederaceum, the "velvet philodendron," is a subspecies which is in the houseplant trade under its previous name of Philodendron micans.

Description and cultivation

Under the synonym Philodendron scandens it has gained the Royal Horticultural Society's Award of Garden Merit.

Toxicity
Parts of the plant are known to contain calcium oxalate crystals in varying concentrations. Although the plant is known to be toxic to mice and rats, the current literature is conflicting with regards to its toxicity in cats. Its possible toxic effects on humans are currently unknown although likely very mild if not harmless.

References

External links
 
 Philodendron cordatum (hort.) info

Flora of Central America
Flora of the Caribbean
House plants
hederaceum